Disraeli (1921) is an American silent historical drama film directed by Henry Kolker and starring George Arliss. This film features Arliss's portrayal of Benjamin Disraeli. He had played the same role in the play Disraeli in 1911. Arliss also reprised this role in the 1929 sound film Disraeli.

A British film of the play, Disraeli, had been made in 1916 with the permission of the author Louis Napoleon Parker. Because of the production of the 1916 film angered Arliss while he was still performing the play on Broadway, Arliss later secured all screen rights to the play from its author Louis Napoleon Parker. The 1921 movie is the result of Arliss's use of his rights after his efforts and frustrations with Parker.

Plot
As described in a film magazine, Disraeli (Arliss), a middle class Jew, has become the British Prime Minister under Queen Victoria and incurs the enmity of nobles and racist snobs. He knows that Russia is angling through diplomacy and intrigue for possession of the Suez Canal and, realizing that unless Britain secures it, the strength of her empire will be lost. He plays a lone game for control of the canal and wins. In his final hour of honor at court, those who stood against him claim the honor of having helped him.

Cast
 George Arliss as Benjamin Disraeli
 Florence Arliss as Lady Beaconsfield (credited as Mrs. George Arliss)
 Margaret Dale as Mrs. Noel Travers
 Louise Huff as Clarissa
 Reginald Denny as Charles, Viscount Deeford
 E. J. Ratcliffe as Hugh Meyers
 Henry Carvill as Duke of Glastonbury
 Grace Griswold as Duchess of Glastonbury
 Noel Tearle as Foljambe
 Fred Nicholls as Butler
 Betty Blythe as (undetermined role)

Preservation
According to silentera.com, this is a lost film with the exception of one reel held at the George Eastman House. The FIAF database and Library of Congress Silent Database list complete copies of Disraeli in Gosfilmofond, Moscow, Russia, and Cinematheque Royale de Belgique in Brussels.

See also
List of rediscovered films

References

External links

Still on the set of the 1921 Disraeli (University of Washington, Sayre Collection) 

New Arliss Book – A Photo Reconstruction of the 1921 “Lost” DISRAELI at arlissarchives.com

1921 films
1920s historical drama films
American historical drama films
American silent feature films
Cultural depictions of Benjamin Disraeli
American films based on plays
Films directed by Henry Kolker
Films set in England
Films set in London
Films set in the 19th century
Films set in the 1870s
United Artists films
1920s rediscovered films
Films about prime ministers of the United Kingdom
American black-and-white films
Rediscovered American films
1920s American films
Silent American drama films